The Córas Iompair Éireann 401 Class locomotives were built in 1957–1958 and designed for use on branch line traffic and shunting.

They were numbered E401–E419, and were withdrawn from service between 1968 and 1977 and none were preserved.

Model 
The E401 was available as a resin model from "Q Kits", but this company is no longer trading as the owner has retired.

A 401 Body is now available from Shapeways via Valvedesigns (a Rapid Prototyping Service)

References

External links 
 Eiretrains - Irish Locomotives

Iarnród Éireann locomotives
C locomotives
Railway locomotives introduced in 1957
Diesel-hydraulic locomotives
5 ft 3 in gauge locomotives
Diesel locomotives of Ireland
Scrapped locomotives